The Urgent Deficiencies Act of 1913 authorized the elimination of many nonessential government publications.

Legislation
As part of the legislation, all information relating to the U.S. Postal Service, including the statement of allowances to mail contractors, was removed from the Official Register.  The list of ships and vessels belonging to the United States was eliminated as well.  The bill also declared that Federal district courts would have jurisdiction in cases brought to enjoin, set aside, annul, or suspend in whole or in part any order of the Interstate Commerce Commission (ICC).  Put another way, I.C.C. orders and enforcements were now subject to Federal district court review, and the special commerce Court of the I.C.C. was abolished.  Such cases would be decided upon by specially constituted three-judge panels that would hear and decide on the merits of the arguments for or against enforcement.

Amendments
The district court right of review portion of the act was repealed in 1975.  There was also a rider attached to the bill that abolished nepotism within the Bureau of Internal Revenue and Treasury Department, added after Treasury Secretary McAdoo was accused of appointing 5 family members under the name "Eisner."

1913 in American law
United States federal legislation
United States government information
Printing in the United States